Dean Snedker (born 17 November 1994) is an English footballer who plays for  side AFC Rushden & Diamonds, where he plays as a goalkeeper.

Club career

Northampton Town
Born in Northampton, Snedker started a two-year scholarship with Northampton Town in July 2011 after coming through their youth system. His professional debut for Northampton came on 14 August 2012, in a 2–1 victory over Cardiff City in the Football League Cup. He signed his first professional contract with the club in August 2012.

He joined Carshalton Athletic on a month-long loan in September 2013. His loan was extended by a further month in October 2013.

He joined Banbury United in December 2013 on a month-long loan.

On 6 August 2014, Snedker joined Conference North side Brackley Town on loan until January 2015. Snedker was recalled from the loan on 15 September 2014, as cover for the injured Matt Duke. He rejoined them on a short-term loan in November 2014.

Brackley Town
In February 2015, Snedker had his contract terminated by Northampton Town, and subsequently signed for Brackley Town, before leaving in the summer.

Kidderminster Harriers
In July 2015, Snedker signed for Kidderminster Harriers following a successful trial. He appeared in 30 league matches across the 2015–16 league season.

Nuneaton Town
In August 2016, Snedker signed for National League North side Nuneaton Town, and made one appearance for the club.

Hemel Hempstead Town
Snedker then signed for Hemel Hempstead Town in September 2016.

Kettering Town
He joined Kettering Town on dual registration in October 2016.

Cambridge City
In 2017, Snedker signed for Southern League Premier Division side Cambridge City.

St Albans City
He joined National League South side St Albans City in June 2017. He made 119 league appearances for the club over the following three seasons, before leavig the club in 2020.

Hemel Hempstead Town
He joined fellow National League South side Hemel Hempstead Town in October 2020.

AFC Rushden & Diamonds
On 9 August 2021, Southern League Premier Division Central side AFC Rushden & Diamonds announced the signings of Snedker and Dean Dummett ahead of the 2021–22 season. Snedker made his Southern League Premier Division Central debut for AFC Rushden & Diamonds on 18 August 2021, in a home fixture against Banbury United. The visitors won the match 2–0. On 19 January 2022, it was confirmed that Snedker had signed a contract and committed to AFC Rushden & Diamonds for the remainder of the 2021–22 season.

On 22 July 2022, Dean signed forms with Southern League Premier Division Central side AFC Rushden & Diamonds to remain with the club for the 2022–23 season.

International career
He was called up to the England under-19 team in January 2013, and made his debut for them the following month in 3–1 victory over Denmark.

Statistics

References

External links

1994 births
Living people
Footballers from Northampton
English footballers
England youth international footballers
Association football goalkeepers
Northampton Town F.C. players
Carshalton Athletic F.C. players
Banbury United F.C. players
Brackley Town F.C. players
National League (English football) players
English Football League players
Isthmian League players
Southern Football League players
Kidderminster Harriers F.C. players
Nuneaton Borough F.C. players
Kettering Town F.C. players
Hemel Hempstead Town F.C. players
Cambridge City F.C. players
St Albans City F.C. players
AFC Rushden & Diamonds players